The 1952 Basque Pelota World Championships were the 1st edition of the Basque Pelota World Championships organized by  the FIPV.

Participating nations

Events
A total of 17 events were disputed, in 5 playing areas.

Trinquete, 4 events disputed

Fronton (30 m), 1 event disputed

Fronton (36 m), 5 events disputed

Fronton (54 m), 2 events disputed

Plaza Libre, 5 events disputed

Medal table

Notes

References

World Championships,1952
World Championships
1952 in sports
Sport in San Sebastián
1952 in Spanish sport
August 1952 sports events in Europe
September 1952 sports events in Europe
International sports competitions hosted by Spain
World Championships,1952